Jahar Dasgupta, (born 31 May 1942) is a contemporary painter from India. He was born in Jamshedpur, India.

Early life and education
Jahar Dasgupta's childhood spent in Jamshedpur where at the small age he used to draw elephants, dogs, trees on the floor. Later their family moved to Dhanbad due to his father Mr. Narendranath Dasgupta who worked in TISCO in an executive post left the job and joined Central Institute of Mining and Fuel Research institute as a scientist. At the age of 9 he draw Stalin face and Ma Sarada Devi on the wall. This took the attention of his parents and they decided to send him in some art school. In 1960 he was admitted to  Visva-Bharati University at Santiniketan, the place of Rabindranath Tagore. That was a turning point in his life. In Kala Bhavana, he took his primary lessons under mentors like Nand Lal Bose, Ramkinkar Baiz and Benode Behari Mukherjee. In 1964, he obtained diploma from Kala Bhavana.

His first job was an art teacher in a non Bengali school in North Calcutta where he served for many years. In his struggling time, he also took many art tuitions to run his family. Simultaneously he continued to participate art shows regularly.

Career

Dasgupta had developed his individual style in paintings and drawings. Previously he has painted in oil medium and now he mainly works in ink,  pastel and acrylic colour.

His first solo exhibition organised in Birla Academy. His others solo exhibitions took place in Laxmana Art Gallery, Lalit Kala Academy, Chitrakoot, Academy of Fine Arts, Calcutta. He exhibited his first solo in abroad in 2004 at Gallery Hansmania (Norway) and later at Club Bangladesh (Sweden). Dasgupta also participated many group exhibitions throughout in India and abroad. Group shows like Aakriti Art Gallery, Birla Academy, Academy of Fine Arts, Calcutta, Jehangir Art Gallery, AIFACS, Kamalnayan Bajaj Art Gallery, India Habitat Centre, Nehru Centre, Lokayata Art Gallery, Chemould Art Gallery, Mulk Raj Anand Centre and many other places. His paintings exhibited in South Korea, London, Paris and Canada. He was invited at NABC in 2010 hosted by Kallol a non-profit socio-cultural organization of Bengalis, New Jersey. After that his last solo exhibition was organised by Tagore Society at 60,000 square metres (6.0 ha) performing arts center located in Marina Bay popularly known Esplanade - Theatres on the Bay Singapore in the year 2011.

1969–1971
In 1969, a few kind souls, total seven ex-students of Santiniketan like Jahar and Baroda Art College students came together to form a group named Painters' Orchestra, now one of the oldest artist groups in India. Since that time Jahar Dasgupta is regular participant in the group shows of this organisation and also went for few solos as well. His first solo exhibition was organised in Birla Art and Culture Kolkata, West Bengal. He developed his own style of expression since the beginning of 1970-s after passing through a period of apprenticeship during 1960-s. In this sense he may be categorised as an artist of 1970-s.

1971–1980

End of 1960s and beginning of 1970s was a period of political turmoil. The left movement in the fold of CPI(ML) rose to its peak ushering in deaths and murders in a devastating measure. The Bangladesh liberation war of 1971 also created great commotion. All creative persons were somehow or other affected by these incidents. All these social upheavals had great impact on his creative self. In early phase his paintings often revealed reality in its crudest form. An acrylic canvas of 1994 titled 'Scrap' shows clusters of dilapidated human bodies tied together are being pulled up from a crate by a crane.

1981–1999

Jahar never tried being repetitive with one fixed subject. He explored with various subjects and style in different forms in respective times. In one side 'End of an Era', 'Genocide', 'Waiting for Godo', 'Dark side of Civilization', Series of 'Confrontation', 'Shelter' are the reflection of anger and crude rebellion. On the other side through 'Mermaid' series, 'Fall of Radhika' series, 'Eternal Love' series, he touch the chord of beauty ingrained in life. His paintings at that time swing between the two aspects of this duality, ideal and the real, good and evil, light and darkness.

Rotary Club of Madhyamgram recognised by(Rotary International) facilitated him with Lifetime Achievement Award in Fine Arts in the year 2000.

2000–2009

In this era, Jahar mainly concentrated on nature, animal and woman in his canvases. The drawings have been mostly done in dry pastel both in monochrome of black and white. The canvases in acrylic open up various aspects of ideal beauty. The widespread nature of rural Bengal reveals its colourful faces. The nature is transformed into supernatural. These paintings narrates full of life, love, spirit, joy and fantasy.

Sandip Ray, young film director from Bengal who filmed Himghar in 1996, met Dasgupta and showed interest for a documentary on artist. Later, in 2001, he completed the documentary named 'Bornomoy Jahar' and screened at Nandan.

2010–present

While attending a talk entitled 'Nadir Bhabna' (Musings of the river) by Shri Alokeranjan Dasgupta, the artist Shri Jahar Dasgupta encountered a mind blowing experience. Acknowledged gratefully by the painter, the inter-face opened for him the doors to the world of Bergson and his revolutionary thinking.

This was his very first acquaintance with the philosophy of the French thinker and evolutionist Henri Bergson (1894–1941). The uplifting spiritual content of Bergson enkindled the thought process of the artist. All the present series and solos is a living tale of the journey. In fact he is the first artist to apply the theory of Bergson into fine art. This is a very rare and unconventional thinking by Jahar where he blends the science and art beautifully into his canvas.

Shri Dasgupta's creative impulse is enthused by this Aristollean 'entelechy' – the endowment that gives rise to the potential of the vital force. This by itself becomes the prime moves of the artist's imagination. In his depiction of the teeming world of the humans, the birds and beasts and the minutest of insects, he does not change the outward form. The artist in him understands that every moment is changing and leaving the imprint of its transience on the inner mechanism of the body. There by it creates an abstract form within which in its turn is represented with a candid intensity of the artist.

Dasgupta's recent work on Jesus Christ series and a huge mural on MADHABI daughter of yayati from Mahabharata is also a notable work from recent times.

Politics
In the 70s, like many people from art and cultural field in West Bengal, Jahar was among those who attracted to left ideologies and immediately attached to Gananatya Sangha. He twice stood on Panchayet vote under left wing parties at Madhyamgram North 24 Parganas in 1974 and 1984.

Jahar Dasgupta was the former President at Academy of Fine Arts in Kolkata where he lives and works. He is also working as a principal of an art academy Swarsangam- Birla Institute of Visual and Performing Arts.

References

External links
 https://web.archive.org/web/20120315035954/http://www.paintersorchestra.com/index.php
 http://www.indianmasterpainters.com/jahardasgupta/jhdhome.htm
 https://archive.today/20150422010959/https://www.canvaskart.com/jahar-dasgupta-paintings
 
 
 https://archive.today/20150422010944/http://www.gingergiraffegallery.com/artist-work.php?id=30
 https://web.archive.org/web/20160303225205/http://www.gaeindia.com/artist.php?fc=J

20th-century Indian painters
1942 births
Living people
People from Jamshedpur
Indian contemporary painters
Indian male painters
Painters from Jharkhand
20th-century Indian male artists
21st-century Indian male artists